Cyathophylla is a genus of flowering plants belonging to the family Caryophyllaceae.

Its native range is Greece to Iran.

Species:

Cyathophylla chlorifolia 
Cyathophylla viscosa

References

Caryophyllaceae
Caryophyllaceae genera